Christian Israel Vargas Claros (born 8 September 1983, in Cochabamba) is a Bolivian football manager and former player who played as a right back. He is the currently manager of Aurora's youth sides.

His former clubs include Wilstermann, The Strongest and Blooming.

Vargas has earned 4 caps with the Bolivia national team. He was a member of the squad that participated in the 2011 Copa América.

Club titles

References
 
 
 

1983 births
Living people
Sportspeople from Cochabamba
Bolivian footballers
Bolivia international footballers
Association football defenders
C.D. Jorge Wilstermann
Club Blooming players
The Strongest players
Club San José players
Club Bolívar players
C.D. Jorge Wilstermann players
Club Real Potosí players
Club Aurora players
Bolivian Primera División players
2011 Copa América players
Bolivian football managers
Club Aurora managers